Gaztambide is an administrative neighborhood (barrio) of Madrid belonging to the district of Chamberí. As of 1 February 2021, it has a population of 23,038.

References 

Wards of Madrid
Chamberí